The Head Mountains are a group of mountains to the south of Gateway Nunatak and the head of Mackay Glacier near the interior ice plateau of Victoria Land. From west to east the group includes Mount DeWitt, Mount Littlepage, Mount Dearborn and Coalbed Mountain. Named by the Advisory Committee on Antarctic Names after James W. Head III, Department of Geological Sciences, Brown University, an internationally known planetary scientist whose investigations in the McMurdo Dry Valleys during 2002-06 have led to important advances to the concept of Antarctica as an analog of Martian features.

References

Mountains of Victoria Land